Lifford is a town in County Donegal, Ireland.

Lifford may also refer to:

Places

Canada 
Lifford, Ontario, a community of Manvers Township

United Kingdom 
Lifford, Birmingham, an area of the city
Lifford railway station, a former station
Lifford, County Tyrone, a townland in Northern Ireland

People 

 Lifford (singer), stage name of Lifford Shillingford
 Tina Lifford (born 1954), American actress and playwright
 Troy Lifford, Canadian politician in New Brunswick
 Viscount Lifford, title in the peerage of Ireland

See also
Lifford (Parliament of Ireland constituency)